Duggannaralalage Wasantha Kumara Bandara, popularly as Dukaa, is an actor in Sri Lankan cinema and stage drama as well as a lyricist, television host, author and media personality.

Personal life
He was born in Hingulwala, Kandy. He completed primary education Kahatagasdigiliya Primary School and then secondary education from Anuradhapura Central College. He is a graduate of University of Sri Jayewardenepura.

He is married to Manoja and the couple has one daughter and one son, Sandapini and Sandalindu.

Drama career
In 1995, he joined with Sawana radio channel as a professional journalist under the guidance of Jackson Anthony. During school times, he produced stage plays such as Seeruwen Sitin and Ghathakayo. Then he acted in many popular stage plays during university life, such as Paraassa, Dewaraii, Yakshagamanaya, Deweni Mahinda and Derdandaa.

On 2 April 2016, he conducted a show titled Dukaa at Nelum Pokuna Theater to celebrate 25 years in media career. He produced a stage drama Baala Samaagama along with Mihira Sirithilaka and Ajith Lokuge.

Television career
He also acted in the popular television serial Ingammaruwa. He hosted the television reality program CIC Shoora Goviya for two seasons, which was telecast in TV Derana. He then hosted the theater program Sonduru Agnyaawa telecasted in ITN. He along with fellow actor Ajith Lokuge became the winners of reality show Star City Comedy Season. 

He is the founder of television company, Right Brain Networks. He produced two programs through the company – Agree with Murali and Raeta Raeta. Both programs are telecast on ITN.

Author work
He has published two books – Man Sinhayata Bayai Nangiye and U Thamai Duka.

Filmography
His maiden cinema acting came through 1998 film Julietge Bhumikawa directed by Jackson Anthony. Then he worked with Jackson again in the 2008 blockbuster hit Aba.

As actor

As lyricist

Lyrics
He has contributed to more than 300 popular songs ranges from classical pop, R&B, Blues and Hip Hop genre. In 1996, he wrote the popular song Man Sinhayata Bayay Nangiye for Senanayake Weraliyadde. In 2000, he composed popular hit Ran Kurahan Mala for BnS. And the song Mal Pan Podak written for BnS became the song of the millennial youth. Then he wrote the song Nethra. After that Dushyanth Weeraman, Iraj Weeraratne, Chinthi and Ranindu come into the field while working. Dushyanth's song Pana Senehasa was also very popular. Then he came with the song Ahankara Nagare for Ranidu Lankage. It became the most popular song on the index. 

Also, he made the song Sokoari for newcomer Chinthi. He was reprimanded for writing the song Sokari which later became a social issue. The song Sokari is the only song that was censored with only one word. The word 'Kansa' (meaning "Cannabis") was censored and published in the media. And then, Duka wrote the first ringing tone song in Sri Lanka, Ahankara Nagare. The he wrote the song Ravum Kade for Gayantha Perera and song Hanthane for Ashanti de Alwis. For Romesh and Lakshan, he wrote the song Ma Desa Neth Nopiya Balapoo. Meanwhile, Govi Geethaya and Api Wenuwen Api songs  even won awards.

Selected lyrics

 Api Daduru Oyen Panna
 Api Innam Oba Wenuwen
 Binkundo
 Gajaman Nona
 Govi Geethaya
 Hadakam
 Hanthane
 Harima Hadai
 Heta Elivena Thuru Nata
 Hithumathe
 Hitha Poodinneth
 Ilayata Wehila
 Japura Premaya
 Kalakata Passe
 Kulaganak
 Mage Jeewithema
 Mal Pan Podak
 Man Sil Bidagaththe
 Man Sinhayata Bayai Nangiye
 Man Thaniyen Awidin
 Pawurakin Nobidena
 Petaluna
 Premaya Usai
 Ran Kurahan Mala
 Ridum Dena
 Thawa Eka Parak
 Thumba Mal
 Thurule Nidan (Manamali 2)
 Yannada Igilli
 Kathirina
 Adambarai Baluwamanam
 Ahankara Nagare
 Ninda Noyana Hendawe
 Sasara Aranyaye
 Mal Mal Sariya
 Katakarakam
 Muragala Pasukara
 Pana Senehasa
 Thawa Ekaparak
 Pin Manda Ranga Bumiye
 Sindu Hendewa
 Mumunanawa
 Nikula Pembara

References

External links
 Lips kissing was there in 'night rider' also – Dukgannarala
 All the President’s media
 Christmas Festival at Maharagama Cancer Centre, Pediatric Auditorium
 දුකාගේ දුක අධිකරණයේ වමාරන්න හදයි
 ශූර ගොවියා තෝරන්න එස්‌ එම්. එස්‌. වලින් බෑ... දුර්වලයෙකුට එන්නත් බෑ
 Wijeya shines at J’pura awards

Sri Lankan male film actors
Sri Lankan poets
Sri Lankan lyricists
Sri Lankan songwriters
Sri Lankan Buddhists
Sinhalese male actors
Sinhalese writers
20th-century poets
Living people
Year of birth missing (living people)